This is an index of articles related to the issue of feminism, women's liberation, the women's movement, and women's rights.

A 
Act, Pornography Victims Compensation
- Activists, women's rights, list of
- Advertising, sex in
- Aid societies, ladies' or soldiers'
- All-female band
- Amazon feminism
- Amendment, Equal Rights
- Anarcha-feminism
- Anthropology, feminist
- Antifeminism
- Anti-pornography feminism (compare Sex-positive feminism)
- Archaeology, feminist
- Archaeology, gender
- Architecture, modern, feminism and
- Art movement, feminist
- Atheist feminism
- Australia, women's suffrage in
- Authors, ecofeminist, list of

B 
Bahrain, women's political rights in
- BDSM, feminist views on
- Bicycling and feminism
- Binary, gender
- Black feminism
- Bonding, female
- Bride burning
- Bride kidnapping
- Burning, bride

C 
Canada, women's rights in
- Car, passenger, women-only
- Chauvinism, female (compare Male chauvinism)
- Chicana feminism
- Christmas Letter, Open
- Choice, pro-
- Christian feminism
- Cinema, women's
- Colonial, post-, feminism
- Comics, women in, portrayal of
- Compensation Act, Pornography Victims
- Composition studies, feminist theory in
- Computing, women in
- Consciousness raising
- Conservative feminisms, list of
- Constitution, United States, Nineteenth Amendment to the
- Countries, timeline of first women's suffrage in majority-Muslim
- Crime, gender and
- Criminology, school of, feminist
- Cult of Domesticity
- Culture, feminism in
- Cultural feminism
- Cyberfeminism

D 
Day, International Women's
- Dekh Le
- Difference feminism
- Differences, gender
- Discrimination
- Distinction, sex and gender
- Domestic violence
- Domesticity, Cult of

E 
Ecofeminism
- Ecofeminist authors, list of
- Economics, feminist
- Education, female
- Education, mixed-sex
- Effects on society, feminist
- Egalitarianism
- Egypt, feminism in
- Engineering, women in
- English, gender neutrality in
- English, women's writing in
- English custom, wife selling
- Equal pay for women
- Equal Rights Amendment
- ERA
- Equality, feminism and
- Equality feminism
- Equality, gender
- Equity feminism
- Erotophilia
- Erotophobia
- Existentialism, feminist

F 
Family, matrifocal
- Female bonding (compare Male bonding)
- Female chauvinism (compare Male chauvinism)
- Female education
- Female privilege: see Male privilege)
- Female superiority
- Feminazi
- Feminine psychology (compare Masculine psychology)
- Femininity (compare Masculinity)
- Feminisation of the workplace
- Feminism (compare Masculism)
- Feminism and equality
- Feminism and modern architecture
- Feminism and the Oedipus complex
- Feminism in Australia
- Feminism in culture
- Feminism in Egypt
- Feminism in France
- Feminism in India
- Feminism in international relations
- Feminism in Japan
- Feminism in Nepal
- Feminism in Poland
- Feminist anthropology
- Feminist archaeology
- Feminist art movement
- Feminist art movement in the United States
- Feminist economics
- Feminist effects on society
- Feminist existentialism
- Feminist film theory
- Feminist geography
- Feminist history
- Feminist history in the United Kingdom
- Feminist history in the United States (see also Nineteenth Amendment to the United States Constitution)
- Feminist legal theory
- Feminist literary criticism
- Feminist movement
- Feminist movement in the United States
- Feminist movements and ideologies
- Feminist philosophy
- Feminist political ecology
- Feminist revisionist mythology
- Feminist rhetoricians, list of
- Feminist school of criminology
- Feminist science fiction
- Feminist Sex Wars
- Feminist sexology
- Feminist sociology
- Feminist Studies
- Feminist theology
- Feminist theory
- Feminist theory in composition studies
- Feminist therapy
- Feminist views on BDSM
- Feminist views on pornography
- Feminist views on prostitution
- Feminist views on sexuality
- Feminist views on transgender topics
- Feminists, list of
- Feminists and the Spanish Civil War
- Feminization of poverty
- Fiction, women's
- Film theory, feminist
- Fiction, science, feminist
- Fiction, science, women in
- First-wave feminism
- First women's suffrage in majority-Muslim countries, timeline of
- Fourth-wave feminism in Spain
- First World War, women in the
- France, feminism in
-  Francoist Spain and the democratic transition period, feminism in
- French structuralist feminism

G 
Gender and crime
- Gender archaeology
- Gender binary
- Gender differences
- Gender equality
- Gender history
- Gender identity
- Gender inequality
- Gender mainstreaming
- Gender-neutral language
- Gender neutrality in English
- Gender performativity
- Gender role
- Gender roles in Islam
- Gender, sex and, distinction
- Gender, sociology of
- Gender-specific job title
- Gender studies
- Gendercide
- Gendered division of labour
- Geography, feminist
- Geology, women in
- Girl Power
- Girls, women, and information technology
- Girly girl
- Glass ceiling
- Global feminism
- Grrrl, riot
- Gynarchy
- Gynocentrism (compare Androcentrism)
- Gynocracy (compare Androcracy)
- Gynocriticism
- Gynophobia

H 
Harassment, sexual
- Health, women's (compare Men's health)
- Herstory (compare History)
- Hikes, Suffrage
- History, feminist
- History, gender
- History in the United Kingdom, feminist
- History in the United States, feminist (see also Nineteenth Amendment to the United States Constitution)
- History, in, legal rights of women
- History of feminism
- History of women in the military
- History of women in the United States
- History, women's
- History Month, Women's
- Husband-selling

I 
Identity, gender
- Ideologies, feminist movements and
- Income disparity
- Income disparity in the United States, male-female
- Income inequality in the United States
- India, feminism in
- Individualist feminism (also Libertarian feminism)
- Inequality, gender
- Information technology, women, and girls
- International relations, feminism in
- International Women's Day
- International Women's Year
- Islam, gender roles in
- Islam, women and
- Islamic feminism

J 
Japan, feminism in
- Japan, women's suffrage in
- Jewish feminism
- Job title, gender-specific
- Journalism and media professions, women in

K 
Kidnapping, bride
- Kuwait, women's suffrage in

L 
Labour, gendered division of
- Ladies' aid societies
- Language, gender-neutral
- Led, women-, uprisings
- Left, the, and feminism
- Legal rights of women in history
- Legal theory, feminist
- Lesbian
- Lesbian Sex Wars
- Letter, Open Christmas
- Liberal feminism
- Liberation, women's (compare Men's liberation)
- Life, pro-, feminism
- Lipstick feminism
- List of conservative feminisms
- List of ecofeminist authors
- List of feminist rhetoricians
- List of feminists
- List of suffragists and suffragettes
- List of women's rights activists
- List of women's studies journals
- Literary criticism, feminist

M 
Mainstreaming, gender
- Majority-Muslim countries, timeline of first women's suffrage in
- Male-female income disparity in the United States
- Marianismo (compare Machismo)
- Marxist feminism
- Material feminism
- Maternalism (compare Paternalism)
- Matriarchy (compare Patriarchy)
- Matrifocal family
- Matrilineal succession (compare Patrilineal succession)
- Matrilineality (compare Patrilineality)
- Matrilocal residence (compare Patrilocal residence)
- Media professions, journalism and, women in
- Medicine, women in (compare Men in nursing)
- Men and feminism
- Military, history of women in the
- Millie Tant
- Misogyny (compare Misandry, Philandry, Philogyny)
- Mixed-sex education
- Modern architecture, feminism and
- Modern, post-, feminism
- Month, History, Women's
- Motherhood, sociology of (compare Sociology of fatherhood)
- Mother's rights (compare Father's rights)
- Movement, feminist
- Movement in the United States, feminist
- Movement, women's (compare Men's movement)
- Movements and ideologies, feminist
- Muliebrity (compare Virility)
- Music, women's
- Muslim, majority-, countries, timeline of first women's suffrage in
- Mythology, feminist revisionist

N 
Nepal, feminism in
- New feminism (also Catholic feminism)
- New Woman
- New Zealand, timeline of feminist art in
- Nineteenth Amendment to the United States Constitution)

O 
Objectification
- Objectification, sexual
- Occupational sexism
- Oedipus complex, feminism and
- Open Christmas Letter

P 
Passenger car, women-only
- Patriarchy
- Pay, equal, for women
- Performativity, gender
- Philosophy, feminist
- Philosophy, women in
- Philandry (compare Philogyny, Misandry, Misogyny)
- Philogyny
- Pink-collar worker
- Playgirl
- Poland, feminism and
- Political ecology, feminist
- Political rights in Bahrain, women's
- Politics, women in
- Porn wars
- Pornography, anti-, feminism (compare Sex-positive feminism)
- Pornography, feminist views on
- Pornography Victims Compensation Act
- Portrayal of women in comics
- Postcolonial feminism
- Postmodern feminism
- Poverty, feminization
- Privilege: see Male privilege
- Pro-choice
- Pro-feminism
- Pro-life feminism
- Prostitution, feminist views on
- Protective laws
- Protofeminism
- Psychology, feminine (compare Masculine psychology)

Q 
Queer studies
- Queer theory

R 
Radical feminism
- Red Tent Meetings
- Reproductive justice
- Reproductive rights
- Republican motherhood
- Residence, matrilocal (compare Patrilocal residence)
- Revisionist mythology, feminist
- Revolution, sexual
- Rhetoricians, feminist, list of
- Rights activists, women's, list of
- Rights Amendment, Equal
- Rights, legal, of women in history
- Rights (other than voting), women's, timeline of
- Rights, political, in Bahrain, women's
- Rights, women's (compare Men's rights)
- Rights in Canada, women's
- Riot grrrl
- Role, gender
- Roles in the World Wars, women's

S 
Science fiction, feminist
- Science, women in
- Science fiction, women in
- Second-wave feminism
- Segregation, sex
- Selling, husband-
- Selling, wife
- Selling, wife, English custom
- Separatist feminism
- Sex and gender distinction
- Sex in advertising
- Sex-positive feminism (compare Anti-pornography feminism)
- Sex segregation
- Sex wars, feminist
- Sexism
- Sexology, feminist
- Sexual harassment
- Sexual objectification
- Sexual revolution
- Sexuality, feminist views on
- Sexualization (as a political term)
- Shelter, women's (compare Men's shelter)
- Socialist feminism
- Societies, ladies' aid or soldiers' aid
- Society, effects on, feminist
- Sociology, feminist
- Sociology of gender
- Sociology of motherhood (compare Sociology of fatherhood)
- Soldiers' aid societies
- Standpoint feminism
- Standpoint theory
- State feminism
- Structuralist feminism, French
- Studies, Feminist
- Succession, matrilineal (compare Patrilineal succession)
- Suffrage
- Suffrage, women's
- Suffrage Hikes
- Suffrage, women's, in Switzerland
- Suffrage, women's, timeline of
- Suffrage, women's, timeline in majority-Muslim countries
- Suffrage in Australia, women's
- Suffrage in Japan, women's
- Suffrage in Kuwait, women's
- Suffrage in Switzerland, women's
- Suffrage in the United Kingdom, women's
- Suffrage in the United States, women's
- Suffragette
- Suffragists and suffragettes, list of

T 
Tant, Millie
- Thealogy
- Theology, feminist
- Theology, womanist
- Theory, feminist
- Therapy, feminist
- Third-wave feminism
- Timeline of first women's suffrage in majority-Muslim countries
- Timeline of women's suffrage
- Timeline of women's rights (other than voting)
- Tomboy
- Transfeminism
- Transgender topics, feminist views on
- Transnational feminism
- Trophy wife

U 
United Kingdom, women's suffrage in the
- United States Constitution, Nineteenth Amendment to the
- United States, feminist movement in the
- United States, income disparity in the, male-female
- United States, women in the, history of
- United States, women's suffrage in the
- Uprisings, women-led

V 
V-Day
- Vésuviennes
- Victims Compensation Act, Pornography
- Victorian era, women in the
- Views, feminist, on BDSM
- Views, feminist, on prostitution
- Views, feminist, on sexuality
- Views, feminist, on transgender topics
- Views on pornography, feminist
- Violence against women
- Violence, domestic

W 
Waves of feminism
- Wave, first-, feminism
- Wave, second-, feminism
- Wave, third-, feminism
- Wife selling
- Wife selling (English custom)
- Wife, trophy
- Woman question, the
- Womanism
- Womanist theology
- Women and Islam
- Women in comics, portrayal of
- Women in computing
- Women in engineering
- Women in World War I
- Women in geology
- Women in journalism and media professions
- Women in medicine (compare Men in nursing)
- Women in military, history of
- Women in philosophy
- Women in politics
- Women in science
- Women in science fiction
- Women in the First World War
- Women in the military, history of
- Women in the United States, history of
- Women in the Victorian era
- Women in the workforce
- Women in United States, history of
- Women in World War I
- Women-only passenger car
- Women's cinema
- Women's Day, International
- Women's Equal Rights Law of Israel (1951)
- Women's fiction
- Women's health (compare Men's health)
- Women's history
- Women's History Month
- Women's liberation (compare Men's liberation)
- Women's movement (compare Men's movement)
- Women's music
- Women's political rights in Bahrain
- Women's rights (compare Men's rights)
- Women's rights (other than voting), timeline of
- Women's rights activists, list of
- Women's rights in Canada
- Women's roles in the World Wars
- Women's shelter (compare Men's shelter)
- Women's studies (compare Men's studies)
- Women's suffrage
- Women's suffrage in Australia
- Women's suffrage in Japan
- Women's suffrage in Kuwait
- Women's suffrage in Switzerland
- Women's suffrage in the United Kingdom
- Women's suffrage in the United States
- Women's suffrage, first, in majority-Muslim countries, timeline of
- Women's suffrage, timeline of
- Women's writing in English
- Women's Year, International
- Women, girls, and information technology
- Wimmin
- Womyn
- Worker, pink-collar
- Workforce, women in the
- Workplace, feminisation of the
- World War I, women in the
- World Wars, women's roles in the
- Writing in English, women's
- Women-led uprisings

Y 
Year, International Women's

 
Feminism-related lists
Feminism topics